Yair Farm is an Israeli settlement in the West Bank, built as an illegal outpost in 1999 and legalized in 2021 by the Israeli government. Located near Nofim and Yakir, it falls under the jurisdiction of Shomron Regional Council. It is home to around 70 families.

The international community considers Israeli settlements in the West Bank illegal under international law, but the Israeli government disputes this.

History
The village was first established in 1999 as an outpost and named after Avraham (Yair) Stern, leader of the pre-state underground militant group  Lehi, though the community's website notes the name of Yair ben Menashe. Although it was later evacuated, it was re-established in February 2001. The Sasson Report reported that the Israeli Ministry of Housing and Construction had allocated 1 million Israeli new shekels for the construction of several structures at the outpost.

In January 2021, the outpost was regulated by the Israeli government, which declared it "a neighborhood of the Yakir settlement".

References

Israeli settlements in the West Bank
Populated places established in 1999
1999 establishments in the Palestinian territories